Kyrgyz (autonym: , tr. Kyrgyz tili) is a Turkic language of the Kipchak branch spoken in Central Asia. Kyrgyz is the official language of Kyrgyzstan and a significant minority language in the Kizilsu Kyrgyz Autonomous Prefecture in Xinjiang, China and in the Gorno-Badakhshan Autonomous Region of Tajikistan. There is a very high level of mutual intelligibility between Kyrgyz, Kazakh, and Altay.  A dialect of Kyrgyz known as Pamiri Kyrgyz is spoken in Afghanistan and Pakistan.

Kyrgyz is also spoken by many ethnic Kyrgyz through the former Soviet Union, Afghanistan, Turkey, parts of northern Pakistan, and Russia.

Kyrgyz was originally written in Göktürk script, gradually replaced by the Perso-Arabic alphabet (in use until 1928 in the USSR, still in use in China). Between 1928 and 1940 a Latin-script alphabet, the Uniform Turkic Alphabet, was used. In 1940, Soviet authorities replaced the Latin script with the Cyrillic alphabet for all Turkic languages on its territory. When Kyrgyzstan became independent following the Soviet Union's collapse in 1991, a plan to adopt the Latin alphabet became popular. Although the plan has not been implemented, it remains in occasional discussion.

Classification 
Kyrgyz is a Common Turkic language belonging to the Kipchak branch of the family. It is considered to be an East Kipchak language, forming a subfamily with the Southern Altai language within the greater Kipchak branch. Internally, Kyrgyz has three distinct varieties; Northern and Southern  Kyrgyz.

History

In 925 when the Liao dynasty defeated the Yenisei Kyrgyz and expelled them from the Mongolian steppes, some Ancient Kyrgyz elites settled in Altai and Xinjiang where they mixed with the local Kipchaks, resulting in a language shift. 

After the Mongol conquest in 1207 and a series of revolts against the Yuan dynasty, Kyrgyz-speaking tribes started to migrate to Tian Shan, which was already populated by various Turco-Mongol tribes. As Chaghatai Ulus subjects, the Kyrgyz converted to Islam. Persian and Arabic vocabulary loaned to the Kyrgyz language, but to a much lesser extent than Kazakh, Uzbek and Uighur.

Phonology

 appears only in borrowings from Persian or when followed by a front vowel later in the word (regressive assimilation), e.g.

The United States Peace Corps trains its volunteers using a "Left-Right Shift" method when carrying out language training in the Kyrgyzstan.

Writing system

The Kyrgyz in Kyrgyzstan use a Cyrillic alphabet, which uses all the Russian letters plus ң, ө and ү.

In the Xinjiang region of China, an Arabic alphabet is used.

Between 1928 and 1940 a Latin alphabet was used for many minority languages in the USSR, including Kyrgyz. There have been attempts after 1990 to introduce other Latin alphabets which are closer to the Turkish alphabet, e.g. the Common Turkic Alphabet.

Morphology and syntax

Case
Nouns in Kyrgyz take a number of case endings that change based on vowel harmony and the sort of consonant they follow (see the section on phonology).

However, with the dative suffix in Kyrgyz, the vowel is decided normally, but the decision between velars and uvulars can be decided based on a contacting consonant, for example банк /bank/ 'bank' + GA yields банкка , not  as predicted by the following vowel.

Pronouns 
Kyrgyz has eight personal pronouns:

The declension of the pronouns is outlined in the following chart. Singular pronouns (with the exception of сиз, which used to be plural) exhibit irregularities, while plural pronouns don't. Irregular forms are highlighted in bold.

In addition to the pronouns, there are several more sets of morphemes dealing with person.

Verbs 
Verbs are conjugated by analyzing the root verb: 1) determine whether the end letter is a vowel or consonant 2) add appropriate suffix while following vowel-harmony/shift rules.

Subordinate clauses 
To form complement clauses, Kyrgyz nominalises verb phrases. For example, "I don't know what I saw" would be rendered as:

The sentence above is also an excellent example of Kyrgyz vowel harmony; notice that all the vowel sounds are front vowels.

Several nominalisation strategies are used depending on the temporal properties of the relativised verb phrase: -GAn(dIK) for general past tense, -AAr for future/potential unrealised events, and -A turgan(dɯq) for non-perfective events are the most common. The copula has an irregular relativised form экен(дик) which may be used equivalently to forms of the verb бол- be (болгон(дук), болор). Relativised verb forms may, and often do, take nominal possessive endings as well as case endings.

See also
BGN/PCGN romanization of Kyrgyz
Kyrgyz people
Romanization of Kyrgyz

Notes and references

Bibliography

 
 Krippes, Karl A. (1998). Kyrgyz: Kyrgyz-English/English-Kyrgyz: Glossary of Terms. Hippocrene Books, New York. .
 Library of Congress, Country Studies, Kyrgyzstan.
 Comrie, Bernard. 1983. The languages of the Soviet Union. Cambridge: Cambridge University Press.
 Beckwith, Christopher I. 1987/1993. "The Tibetan Empire in Central Asia." Princeton: Princeton University Press.
 Tchoroev, Tyntchtykbek. 2003. The Kyrgyz.; in: The History of Civilisations of Central Asia, Vol. 5, Development in contrast: from the sixteenth to the mid-nineteenth century /Editors: Ch. Adle and Irfan Habib. Co-editor: Karl M. Baipakov. – UNESCO Publishing. Multiple History Series. Paris. – Chapter  4, p. 109–125..

External links

 El-Sozduk – English-Kyrgyz online dictionary, phrasebook, Android app
 Ferdinand, S. & Komlósi, F. 2016. Vitality of the Kyrgyz Language in Bishkek. IJORS, 5/2, pp. 210–226.
 Kyrgyz language
 Root Vowels and Affix Vowels: Height Effects in Kyrgyz Vowel Harmony
  "事前学習補助教材Кыргыз тили （キルギス語）" (Kyrgyz exercises; Archive) - Japan International Cooperation Agency
 The Talking Kyrgyz Phrasebook
 Кыргыз тили – Kyrgyz language resources (in Russian)
 Кербен Translit – Easy Kyrgyz-Cyrillic–Latin converter
 Kyrgyz Cyrillic–Arabic–Latin converter
 Kyrgyz–Russian–English Dictionary
 Kyrgyz Latin Alphabet
 Kyrgyz-Turkish Dictionary
 Kyrgyz<>Turkish dictionary (Pamukkale University)
 Russian-Kyrgyz Kyrgyz-Russian Dictionary
 Kyrgyz – Apertium

 
Agglutinative languages
Vowel-harmony languages
Turkic languages
Languages of China
Languages of Kyrgyzstan
Languages of Pakistan
Languages of Russia
Languages of Kazakhstan
Turkic languages of Afghanistan
Languages of Uzbekistan
Languages of Tajikistan
Languages of Turkey
Ethnic Kyrgyz people